Reynaldo Gonzalez Lopez (14 September 1948 – 4 July 2015) was a Cuban-born member on the International Olympic Committee (IOC). He served the IOC from 1995 representing Cuba. He also held offices in several international sports administrations. He had a bachelor in pedagogical sciences and a degree in social sciences.

He died in Mexico City on 4 July 2015 at the age of 66.

Sports administration offices
 Secretary General, NOC (1984-200)
 1st Vice President, Instituto Nacional de Deportes, Educación Fisica y Recreación (INDER) (1981-1994)
 President, INDER (1994-7)
 1st Vice President, International Baseball Association (IBA) (1988–1999)
 President, IBAF Ethics committee (1999-?)
 President, Cuban Amateur Baseball Federation (1981–1999)
 Secretary General, Organizing Committee of the XI Panamerican Games (Copan '91)
 Vice President, Organizing Committee of the XIV Central American and Caribbean Games (Havanna '82)
 National Director, University Sports (1997–2001)
 Coordinator General, Panamerican Olympic Solidarity (2001-?)

Olympics

He was a member of the Women and Sport Working Group for 1996–2001, and became a member of the Women and Sport Commission in 2006. He was also a member of the editorial committee of the 2009 Olympic Congress for 2007–2009.

References

1948 births
2015 deaths
International Olympic Committee members
Cuban emigrants to Mexico
People from Ciego de Ávila